The 2002 Slovak Figure Skating Championships were figure skating competition for the 2001–02 season. Skaters competed in the disciplines of men's singles, ladies' singles, pair skating, and ice dancing on the senior level.

Results

Men

Ladies

Pairs

Ice dancing

External links
 results

Slovak Figure Skating Championships, 2002
Slovak Figure Skating Championships
Slovak Figure Skating Championships, 2002